Sherburn House is a hamlet in County Durham, England. It is in the civil parish of Shincliffe.

Sherburn House is the location of Sherburn Hospital.

External links 
 Subterranea Britannica entry on Sherburn House station
 Durham Mining Museum entry on Sherburn House Colliery

Villages in County Durham